Bayou Blue is an unincorporated community and census-designated place in Lafourche and Terrebonne parishes, Louisiana, United States. Its population was 12,352 as of the 2010 census.

In June 1981, an arson attack on a local nightclub killed five people.

Geography

Demographics

2020 census

As of the 2020 United States census, there were 13,352 people, 3,891 households, and 3,049 families residing in the CDP.

References

Unincorporated communities in Lafourche Parish, Louisiana
Unincorporated communities in Terrebonne Parish, Louisiana
Unincorporated communities in Louisiana
Census-designated places in Lafourche Parish, Louisiana
Census-designated places in Terrebonne Parish, Louisiana
Census-designated places in Louisiana